Novohryhorivka may refer to several places in Ukraine:

Donetsk Oblast
 Novohryhorivka, Horlivka Raion, village in Horlivka Raion
 Novohryhorivka, Kramatorsk Raion, Donetsk Oblast, an urban-type settlement in Kramatorsk Raion
 Novohryhorivka, Mariupol Raion, Donetsk Oblast, village in Mariupol Raion
 Novohryhorivka, Myrne settlement hromada, Volnovakha Raion, Donetsk Oblast, village in Volnovakha Raion
 Novohryhorivka, Volnovakha urban hromada, Volnovakha Raion, Donetsk Oblast, village in Volnovakha Raion